Belfegore was the second album by the German band Belfegore.  This was Belfegore's first and last major studio release.  Despite decent sales, the band split up one year later.

All lyrics are sung in English unlike their previous album.  The album was available with two separate covers.  It was released again on CD with several bonus tracks September 2013.

Track listing
(all lyrics written by Meikel Clauss)

"All That I Wanted"
"Questions"
"Love"
"Wake Up With Sirens"
"Seabird, Seamoan"
"Don't You Run"
"Comic With Rats Now"
"Into The Dungeon"
"Belfegore"

Personnel 

 Meikel Clauss – vocals, guitar, electronics
 Charly T. Charles – drums, backing vocals
 Raoul Walton – bass, backing vocals
 Walter Jaeger – synth, bass

External links
http://www.discogs.com/Belfegore-Belfegore/master/55997

1984 albums
Elektra Records albums
Belfegore albums